The 2016 UEFA Women's Under-19 Championship was the 15th edition of the UEFA Women's Under-19 Championship (19th edition if the Under-18 era is included), the annual European international youth football championship contested by the women's under-19 national teams of UEFA member associations. Slovakia, which were selected by UEFA on 20 March 2012, hosted the tournament between 19 and 31 July 2016.

A total of eight teams played in the tournament, with players born on or after 1 January 1997 eligible to participate.

Qualification

The national teams from 47 UEFA member associations entered the competition. With Slovakia automatically qualified as hosts, the other 46 teams contested a qualifying competition to determine the remaining seven spots in the final tournament. The qualifying competition consisted of two rounds: the qualifying round, which took place in autumn 2015, and the elite round, which took place in spring 2016.

Qualified teams
The following eight teams qualified for the final tournament:

Note: All appearance statistics include only U-19 era (since 2002).

Notes

Final draw
The final draw was held on 24 May 2016, 10:00 CEST (UTC+2), at the Hotel Gate One in Bratislava, Slovakia. The eight teams were drawn into two groups of four teams. There was no seeding, except that hosts Slovakia were assigned to position A1 in the draw.

Venues
The tournament was hosted in four venues:
NTC Senec, Senec
Štadión FC ViOn, Zlaté Moravce
OMS ARENA Senica, Senica
Stadium Myjava, Myjava

Squads
Each national team had to submit a squad of 18 players.

Match officials
A total of 6 referees, 8 assistant referees and 2 fourth officials were appointed for the final tournament.

Referees
 Linn Andersson (Sweden)
 Tania Fernandes Morais (Luxembourg)
 Ivana Martinčić (Croatia)
 Lois Otte (Belgium)
 Ivana Projkovska (Macedonia)
 Eszter Urbán (Hungary)

Assistant referees
 Gulyana Guvandiyeva (Azerbaijan)
 Ekaterina Marinova (Bulgaria)
 Kylie McMullan (Scotland)
 Dora Myrianthea (Cyprus)
 Lisa Rashid (England)
 Maryna Striletska (Ukraine)
 Sabina Valieva (Russia)
 Veronica Vettorel (Italy)

Fourth officials
 Petra Pavlíková Chudá (Slovakia)
 Zuzana Valentová (Slovakia)

Group stage

The final tournament schedule was confirmed on 1 June 2016.

The group winners and runners-up advanced to the semi-finals.

Tiebreakers
The teams were ranked according to points (3 points for a win, 1 point for a draw, 0 points for a loss). If two or more teams were equal on points on completion of the group matches, the following tie-breaking criteria were applied, in the order given, to determine the rankings:
Higher number of points obtained in the group matches played among the teams in question;
Superior goal difference resulting from the group matches played among the teams in question;
Higher number of goals scored in the group matches played among the teams in question;
If, after having applied criteria 1 to 3, teams still had an equal ranking, criteria 1 to 3 were reapplied exclusively to the group matches between the teams in question to determine their final rankings. If this procedure did not lead to a decision, criteria 5 to 9 applied;
Superior goal difference in all group matches;
Higher number of goals scored in all group matches;
If only two teams have the same number of points, and they were tied according to criteria 1 to 6 after having met in the last round of the group stage, their rankings were determined by a penalty shoot-out (not used if more than two teams had the same number of points, or if their rankings were not relevant for qualification for the next stage).
Lower disciplinary points total based only on yellow and red cards received in the group matches (red card = 3 points, yellow card = 1 point, expulsion for two yellow cards in one match = 3 points);
Drawing of lots.

All times were local, CEST (UTC+2).

Group A

''The match was abandoned after 50 minutes with the score 0–0 after heavy rain made the pitch unplayable. With France beating the Netherlands 2–1 elsewhere in the final round of group games, neither Norway nor Slovakia could have finished in the top two and reached the semi-finals. The match was therefore not concluded and the result stands at 0–0.

Group B

Knockout stage
In the knockout stage, extra time and penalty shoot-out were used to decide the winner if necessary.

On 2 May 2016, the UEFA Executive Committee agreed that the competition would be part of the International Football Association Board's trial to allow a fourth substitute to be made during extra time.

Bracket

Semi-finals

Final
The final was interrupted after the first half due to heavy rain and the resulting unfit terrain, and the second half began following a two-hour delay.

Goalscorers
6 goals

 Marie-Antoinette Katoto

5 goals

 Jill Roord

4 goals

 Lucía García
 Sandra Hernández

3 goals 

 Clara Matéo
 Nahikari García
 Cinzia Zehnder

2 goals

 Grace Geyoro
 Laura Freigang
 Stefanie Sanders
 Sisca Folkertsma
 Michelle Hendriks
 Andrea Sánchez
 Naomi Mégroz
 Camille Surdez

1 goal

 Ivana Feric
 Delphine Cascarino
 Perle Morroni
 Nina Ehegötz
 Suzanne Admiraal
 Katrine W. Jørgensen
 Aitana Bonmati
 Marta Cazalla
 Lara Jenzer
 Géraldine Reuteler

1 own goal

 Stephanie Deszathová (playing against Netherlands)

Team of the Tournament

Goalkeepers
 Mylène Chavas
 Paulina Quaye

Defenders
 Théa Greboval
 Vita Van Der Linden
 Ashleigh Weerden
 Beatriz Beltrán
 Carmen Menayo

Midfielders
 Grace Geyoro
 Perle Morroni
 Michelle Hendriks
 Lucía García
 Patricia Guijarro
 Sandra Hernández
 Andrea Sánchez

Forwards
 Marie-Antoinette Katoto
 Clara Matéo
 Jill Roord
 Géraldine Reuteler

References

External links

2016 final tournament: Slovakia, UEFA.com

 
2016
Women's Under-19 Championship
2016 Uefa Women's Under-19 Championship
2016 in women's association football
2015–16 in Slovak football
UEFA Women's Under-19 Championship
2016 in youth association football
Senica
2016 in Slovak women's sport